Anisotenes axigera is a species of moth of the family Tortricidae. It is found on Sumatra and Java.

Subspecies
Anisotenes axigera axigera (Sumatra)
Anisotenes axigera talina (Diakonoff, 1941) (Java)

References

Moths described in 1941
Anisotenes
Moths of Indonesia
Taxa named by Alexey Diakonoff